Clarence Fletcher "Lefty" Thomas (October 4, 1903 – March 21, 1952) was a pitcher in Major League Baseball. He played for the Washington Senators in 1925 and 1926.

References

External links

1903 births
1952 deaths
Major League Baseball pitchers
Washington Senators (1901–1960) players
Lynchburg Hornets baseball players
Rochester Tribe players
Hartford Senators players
Baseball players from Virginia
People from Washington County, Virginia